Ann K. Powers (born February 4, 1964) is an American writer and popular music critic. She is a music critic for NPR and a contributor at the Los Angeles Times, where she was previously chief pop critic. She has also written for other publications, such as The New York Times, Blender and The Village Voice. Powers is the author of Weird Like Us: My Bohemian America, a memoir; Good Booty: Love and Sex, Black & White, Body and Soul in American Music, on eroticism in American pop music; and Piece by Piece, co-authored with Tori Amos.

Early life and education
Powers was born and raised in Seattle, Washington. During elementary school, her first poem was published in the Our Lady of Fatima school newspaper.

Powers earned a Bachelor of Arts degree in creative writing from San Francisco State University, and a Master of Arts degree in American literature from the University of California, Berkeley. Powers studied literary theory. She also wrote about music, feminism, film, and religion.

Career
Powers' professional writing career began in 1980 while she was still in high school, when she started writing for the Seattle music weekly magazine The Rocket. After college, in 1986, Powers started writing about popular music and pop culture as a columnist at the San Francisco Weekly. After moving to New York City, she wrote for The New York Times from 1992 to 1993, then was an editor at The Village Voice from 1993 to 1996. From 1997 to 2001, Powers was the pop critic at The New York Times.

From 2001 until May 2005, Powers was senior curator at the Experience Music Project (EMP) in Seattle, which later became Museum of Pop Culture (MoPOP). Powers and her husband Eric Weisbard have helped organize the annual EMP Pop Conference (now MoPOP Conference) since its inception in 2002.

After a brief tenure as Blender magazine's senior critic, in March 2006, she accepted a position as chief pop critic at the Los Angeles Times, where she succeeded Robert Hilburn. Powers wrote regularly for Pop & Hiss, the Los Angeles Times' music blog, in addition to other features and news articles. She remained in this position until March 2011, when she departed for NPR, though she continued as a contributor for the Los Angeles Times afterward. Since 2011, Powers has been NPR Music's critic and correspondent. Powers has written for The Record, NPR's blog about finding, making, buying, sharing, and talking about music, since April 2011. In 2017, Powers spearheaded a multi-platform project at NPR called Turning the Tables. The project sought to reconstitute the canon of American popular music by publishing a list of the 150 greatest albums by women and a related series of essays, audio features, and events. Powers is also the Nashville correspondent for World Cafe, regularly recording sessions with local and regional Southern musicians.

Powers' work often critiques the perceptions of sex, racial, and social minorities in the music industry. She has written about topics such as religion, feminism, and film.

Books
Powers co-edited the 1995 anthology Rock She Wrote: Women Write About Rock, Pop, and Rap, and was the guest editor of the Da Capo Press Best Music Writing 2010.

In 2000, Powers published the memoir Weird Like Us: My Bohemian America. The book focuses on Powers' time living in Seattle, San Francisco, and Brooklyn. Joshua Klein of the A.V. Club described the project as "us[ing Powers'] personal experiences to define how youth culture (what she calls bohemianism) has changed over the years (though she lingers mostly on the '80s)."

In 2005, Powers co-wrote the book Piece by Piece with musician Tori Amos. The book discusses the role of women in the modern music industry and features information about composing, touring, performance, and the realities of the music business.

Powers wrote a proposal for a book on Kate Bush's album The Dreaming that was slated to be published in 2007 as part of the 33⅓ series; however, the project was abandoned when Powers started her job at the Los Angeles Times, and the book was never written.

In August 2017, Powers published the book Good Booty: Love and Sex, Black & White, Body and Soul in American Music. The book reconsiders the history of American popular music through the lens of sexuality and eroticism. It was positively reviewed and was chosen as one of the best books of 2017 by The Wall Street Journal, NPR, No Depression, and BuzzFeed.

Other works
Powers has appeared in various TV shows and documentaries. She was in the film The Punk Singer as an interviewee discussing the influence of Kathleen Hanna on punk music. She also appeared documentaries The Gits and Undeniably Donnie in addition the Behind the Music Remastered episode on Heart.

Personal life
Powers is married to Eric Weisbard, a music critic and professor of American studies at the University of Alabama. They were married in 1998. They moved to Tuscaloosa, Alabama, in 2009, later moving to East Nashville, Tennessee, in 2015. They have a daughter.

Honors and awards
 2008: Artist in Residence, The Popular Music Project at USC Annenberg Norman Lear Center
 2010: ASCAP, Deems Taylor Award for "The Cultural Critic: Lady Gaga, It's Time for Idol to Open the Closet Door" and "My Night with Prince" for the Los Angeles Times

Works and publications

Books

Selected writing
 
  
 
 
 
 
 
 
 
  – Da Capo Best Music Writing 2007
  – Da Capo Best Music Writing 2009
 
 
 
 
 
  – on PJ Harvey's album Rid of Me

See also 
 Album era

References

External links

 
 
 Ann Powers at NPR Music
 Ann Powers at The Record, NPR Music
 Ann Powers at The New York Times

American music critics
Critics employed by The New York Times
Los Angeles Times people
Women writers about music
American women journalists
American women music critics
Writers from Seattle
20th-century American women writers
21st-century American women writers
San Francisco State University alumni
1960s births
Living people
20th-century American non-fiction writers
21st-century American non-fiction writers